Rimantas Plungė (born 23 February 1944) is a Lithuanian athlete. He competed in the men's shot put at the 1972 Summer Olympics, representing the Soviet Union.

References

1944 births
Living people
Athletes (track and field) at the 1972 Summer Olympics
Lithuanian male shot putters
Olympic athletes of the Soviet Union
Place of birth missing (living people)
Sportspeople from Panevėžys
Soviet male shot putters